Nonelela Yikha (born 13 August 2001) is a South African cricketer. He made his first-class debut on 16 January 2020, for Border in the 2019–20 CSA 3-Day Provincial Cup. He made his List A debut on 19 January 2020, for Border in the 2019–20 CSA Provincial One-Day Challenge. In April 2021, he was named in Border's squad, ahead of the 2021–22 cricket season in South Africa.

References

External links
 

2001 births
Living people
South African cricketers
Border cricketers
Place of birth missing (living people)